Juvies is an MTV (Calamari Productions), and later MSNBC television show following minors in the Lake County, Indiana Juvenile Justice Complex. The series' first and only season debuted on MTV in February 2007, and has re-aired regularly since.  On July 30, 2008, the NWI Times reported that production was underway for another documentary series also to be filmed at the Lake County Juvenile Justice Complex in Crown Point, Indiana. The MSNBC version, re-branded as "Lockup - Lake County Juvenile Justice," takes a deeper look at the inner workings of the LCJC detention and court systems, and it ventures into other correctional facilities in Indiana, and premiered on MSNBC on July 4, 2009 at 10:00 E.T.

Overview
Both the MTV and MSNBC versions of Juvies depict what happens to offenders in the Indiana Juvenile Justice system. The show features a behind the scenes look at the detention center and court process as it follows kids charged with committing relatively minor offenses such as underage drinking, minor theft, marijuana use, running away, etc.

Each episode follows two youths from their initial intake in the detention center to their "Detention Hearing" where a judge hears evidence on whether to keep the child detained, or release the child to their parents or elsewhere, pending a trial on the underlying charges. The series does not cover the trial on the charges themselves, however a brief epilogue appears at the end of each hour-long episode updating viewers on the eventual outcome of the case.

They have some special shorts called Life After Juvies on MTV, where it shows how the child is doing after being a juvie.

The unprecedented access (including voluminous amounts of CCTV footage) to the juvenile court system, which is typically closed, was obtained by Calamari Productions from the Indiana Supreme Court.

The song "Sometimes Your Best Isn't Good Enough", performed by The Churchills, is the theme of the show.

Cast

Judge
All of the featured children appear before Lake County Indiana Superior Court Judge Mary Beth Bonaventura.

Defense attorneys
Each child is represented at their detention hearing by a defense attorney - either an appointed public defender or private attorney hired by the family. The Lake County Juvenile Court uses part time public defenders who also maintain private law practices.

Attorneys who appear in episodes on behalf of the children include Donald Wruck, a trial lawyer at Wruck Paupore PC, and solo practitioners, Geoff Giorgi, and Deidre Monroe.

Prosecuting attorneys
The State of Indiana is represented by a deputy prosecuting attorney, who elicits testimony and presents evidence in support of the charges pending against the child. However, because the hearings depicted on "MTV Juvies" are detention hearings, the issues are limited to whether the child should be detained awaiting trial.

The deputy prosecuting attorney appearing in several episodes is Kathy Guzek.

Episodes

Ratings
The show achieved record high ratings for MTV across dual demographics.

References

 MTV Series Goes Behind The Walls of Lake County "Juvie"

External links
 

2007 American television series debuts
2000s American legal television series
Juvenile law
MTV reality television series
American non-fiction television series